The St. Peter and St. Paul's Church is a Roman Catholic church in Tbilisi, the Georgian capital. Pope John Paul II celebrated Mass there during his visit to Georgia in October 1999.

The church was built between 1870 and 1877 on the initiative of Konstantine Zubalashvili, an important member of the Catholic community in Georgia. The project was entrusted to the architect Albert Zaltsman. The architecture of the church is characterized by a marked baroque style.

The church entrance is west. Above the wooden front door there is a rose window decorated with floral ornaments and a dove. These were added in the years after 2000, while the original very high and arched door was transformed into a wall, where the rose window was put, and the church painted in yellow. Its original colour used to be white and silver-grey. The facade is divided by pilasters and arches of a more intense yellow (which used to be originally silver-grey) of Corinth that the rest of the structure.

See also
Roman Catholicism in Georgia
St. Peter and St. Paul's Church (disambiguation)

References

Roman Catholic churches in Georgia (country)
Churches in Tbilisi
Roman Catholic churches completed in 1877
19th-century Roman Catholic church buildings
1877 establishments in the Russian Empire